Sampla is a town and a Municipal committee in the Rohtak district in north Indian state of Haryana. It lies on the NH9 which connects Rohtak to Delhi. It functions as the tehsil headquarters for Sampla .

References

Cities and towns in Rohtak district